Les Allumés du Jazz is an association formed in 1996, regrouping independent labels of all allegiances and widely varying trends, from traditional jazz to the most innovative. Les Allumés du Jazz publishes a newspaper every three to four months. On their website, one can find a catalogue of almost 2,000 available records. More than 3,000 jazz and improvising musicians can be searched.

In 2021 they are 108 labels including:

 AA Le Petit Faucheux
 Abalone
 ACM Jazz Label
 AJMI
 Alambik Musik
 Amor Fati
 ArchieBall
 ARFI
 Au sud du nord
 Axolotl Jazz
 Ayler
 Bisou
 Buda Transes Européennes
 Camille Productions
 Capsul Records
 Celp
 Chief Inspector
 Circum-Disc
 Cismonte è Pumanti
 Coax Records
 Collectif 3h10
 Collectif Musique en Friche
 Collection Commune
 Compagnie des Musiques Têtues
 Cranes Records
 DAC Records
 Das Kapital
 Decalcophonie
 Defragment
 Douzième Lune
 Element 124
 Emil 13
 EMD
 Émouvance
 Fou Records
 Gimini
 Grand Chahut Collectif
 Grolektif
 Grrr
 Igloo
 Il Monstro Prod
 Illusions
 Improvising Beings
 IMR Instantmusicrecords
 In Situ
 Innacor
 Jazzdor
 Jim A. Musiques
 Juju Works
 Juste un bruit, d'où ?
 L'1consolable
 L'arbre Canapas
 La Buissonne
 La nuit transfigurée
 La traversée des apparences
 La Tribu Hérisson
 Label Bleu
 Label La Forge
 Label Laborie
 Label Usine
 Lagunarte
 Le Fondeur du Son
 Le Maxiphone
 Le Triton
 Les neuf filles de Zeus
 Les Productions de l'Orchestre Maigre
 Linoleum
 LMD Productions / Evidence
 Mazeto Square
 Melisse
 Mélodie en sous-sol
 Metal Satin Lutherie Urbaine
 Momentanea
 Musivi / Jazzbank
 MZ Records / Marmouzic
 Naï Nô Records
 nato
 Nemo
 Onze Heures Onze
 Ormo Records
 Ouch ! Records
 Palestro
 Peewee
 Petit Label
 Poros Éditions
 Potlatch
 Quark Record
 Quoi de neuf docteur
 ReQords
 RogueArt
 Rude Awakening présente
 Saravah
 Sometime Studio
 Space Time Records
 Suite
 Terra Incognita
 The Bridge Sessions
 Tour de Bras
 Trois Quatre
 Ulltrabolic
 Umlaut
 Vand'Œuvre
 Vent d'Est
 Vent du Sud
 Vision Fugitive
 Wildscate
 Wing Heart Records
 Yolk

References
 Francis Marmande in Le Monde Diplomatique (December 2004): "Les Allumés du jazz sont le seul journal de jazz à maintenir un point de vue politique sur cette musique" (Les Allumés du Jazz is the only jazz newspaper to maintain a political point of view on this music).
 Les Actualités on Musique Française d'Aujourd'hui MFA

External links 
 Site of Les Allumés du Jazz

French independent record labels
Experimental music record labels